is a former member of the Japanese idol girl group SKE48 of which she was captain of Team KII. Before, she was a member and captain of Team 4, but she was suspended due to her scandal and she returned in January 2012, she was transfer to Team B in 2012 when original Team 4 was disbanded in AKB48.

On October 9, 2021, Ōba announced that she will graduate from SKE48 and leave the idol industry in April 2022, the time of her 30th birthday. Her 3-part graduation concert was on April 1 to 3 (the final day being her 30th birthday celebration). Her final theater performance was on April 23. She was supposed to officially graduate from the group on April 30, but she tested positive for COVID-19 on April 29, the day before her planned graduation. Her graduation date was postponed to May 21.

On January 28, 2023, Oba announced her marriage to Fukuoka SoftBank Hawks baseball player Shuta Ishikawa.

Discography

AKB48 singles

SKE48 singles

Television 
Majisuka Gakuen (2010)
Hanazakari no Kimitachi e (2011)
Majisuka Gakuen 2 (2011)
Shiritsu Bakaleya Koukou (2012)
Majisuka Gakuen 3 (2012)
So Long! (2013)
AKB Horror Night: Adrenaline's Night Ep.6 - Stain (2015)

Filmography
Shiritsu Bakaleya Kōkō (2012)
Hell Girl (2019)

References

External links
  

AKB48 members
Living people
1992 births
Actresses from Kanagawa Prefecture
Japanese film actresses
Japanese television actresses
Musicians from Kanagawa Prefecture
21st-century Japanese women singers
21st-century Japanese singers
21st-century Japanese actresses